John B. Michel (1917–1969) was a science fiction author (sometimes publishing under the name Hugh Raymond) and editor associated with the Futurians, of which he was one of twelve founding members. He was elected director of the Futurians in 1941. He was widely known for his left-wing, utopian politics, which came to be known in science fiction fandom as "Michelism", or the belief that "science-fiction should by nature stand for all forces working for a more unified world, a more Utopian existence, the application of science to human happiness, and a saner outlook on life". Debates over Michelism and its association with technocracy and communism were an object of controversy in fanzines in the late 1930s, and its influence can be seen in much science fiction of the period, including Isaac Asimov's Foundation series.

Michel was a member of the Young Communist League and later joined the CPUSA, although he was asked to leave in 1949 for absenteeism.

In the early 1940s, Michel was briefly romantically associated with Judith Merril.

References

External links

1917 births
1969 deaths
American science fiction writers
Futurians
20th-century American novelists
American male novelists
20th-century American male writers